Valdonedo "Nedo" da Silva Xavier (born 15 October 1952) is a Brazilian retired football manager and former player who played as either a central defender or a defensive midfielder.

Career
In career he played for clubs Coritiba (1975), Marília (1976–1977), Juventus Paulista (1978–1979),  Palmeiras (1979), America do Rio (1980–1981), He returned to Juventus Paulista (1981) and was still Farense closed his career in 1985 with Ginásio de Alcobaça.

Then he worked as an assistant coach at Coritiba and Atlético Mineiro. being that in mining club acted as coach interim, in 2001. after only commanded teams inexpressive, mainly in the interior of the state of Minas Gerais, but during these passages. has worked in large clubs as a Fortaleza, Avaí and América Mineiro. but its great highlight was having carried the Boa Esporte in Serie B. Recently Nedo command the CSA during the Campeonato Alagoano, exiting after. but in a little time he hit with the Paraná Clube, for the rest of the season.

Managerial honours
 Ituiutaba
 Campeonato Mineiro Módulo II: 2011

References

External links

Nedo Xavier at Footballdatabase

Footballers from Curitiba
Brazilian footballers
Brazilian football managers
Campeonato Brasileiro Série A players
Expatriate footballers in Portugal
Campeonato Brasileiro Série A managers
Campeonato Brasileiro Série B managers
Campeonato Brasileiro Série C managers
Coritiba Foot Ball Club players
Marília Atlético Clube players
Clube Atlético Juventus players
Sociedade Esportiva Palmeiras players
America Football Club (RJ) players
S.C. Farense players
G.C. Alcobaça players
Clube Atlético Mineiro managers
Rio Branco Sport Club managers
Fortaleza Esporte Clube managers
FC Atlético Cearense managers
Avaí FC managers
América Futebol Clube (MG) managers
Americano Futebol Clube managers
Guaratinguetá Futebol managers
Boa Esporte Clube managers
Agremiação Sportiva Arapiraquense managers
Itumbiara Esporte Clube managers
Associação Desportiva São Caetano managers
Centro Sportivo Alagoano managers
Paraná Clube managers
1952 births
Living people
Association football defenders
Association football midfielders